The Gallieni Massif is a mountain range in Grande Terre, the main island of Kerguelen in the French Southern Territories zone of the Southern Indian Ocean.

Geography

This range is located in the Gallieni Peninsula, fringing the southern coast. 

The range also includes a number of glacial formations, among which the Buffon Glacier, the La Pilatte Glacier ,the Néves Glacier and the Sélé Glacier deserve mention.

See also
Baie Larose
List of islands by highest point

References

External links
 Global Volcanism Program: Kerguelen Islands

Landforms of the Kerguelen Islands